Horace Judson may refer to:
 Horace Freeland Judson (1931–2011), historian of molecular biology
 Horace A. Judson, American educator and academic administrator
 Horace S. Judson (1863–1926), American glove manufacturer and politician from New York